The Type 24 torpedo boat (also known as the ( (Carnivore) class) was a group of six torpedo boats built for the Reichsmarine during the 1920s. As part of the renamed Kriegsmarine, the boats made multiple non-intervention patrols during the Spanish Civil War in the late 1930s. One was sunk in an accidental collision shortly before the start of World War II in September 1939 and the others escorted ships and searched for contraband for several months of the war. They played a minor role in the Norwegian Campaign of April 1940 and resumed their escort duties. After being transferred to France late in the year, the Type 24s started laying their own minefields in the English Channel.

The surviving boats were refitted in early 1941 and were then transferred to the Skaggerak for escort duties. By the beginning of 1942 there were only two survivors and they were transferred back to France to participate in the Channel Dash. Another boat was lost a few months later trying to escort a commerce raider through the Channel in May. The last surviving boat, spent the next several years laying minefields, escorting blockade runners and U-boats through the Bay of Biscay and convoys in Norwegian waters. Shortly after the Allied invasion of Normandy in June 1944, she was sunk by British bombers.

Design and description
The Type 24 torpedo boat was slightly larger than the preceding Type 23 and had some incremental improvements based on experience with the Type 23s. The boats had a lot of weather helm so that they were "almost impossible to hold on course in wind and at low speed". The design has been criticized for being equipped with too many torpedoes for the role that they were actually used during World War II.

Their hull was divided into 13 watertight compartments and it was fitted with a double bottom that covered 96% of their length. Their crew numbered 129 officers and sailors.

The effective range proved to be only  at that speed.

Armament and sensors
As built, the Type 24s mounted three 52-caliber  SK C/28 guns, one forward and two aft of the superstructure, numbered one through three from bow to stern. The last surviving boat, retained her original gun until her loss in 1944. Each gun was provided with 100 shells. In 1932  and  had their guns bored out to serve as prototypes of the  SK C/34 guns prior to their use on the s.

Vessels of this class carried six above-water 50 cm (19.7 in) torpedo tubes in two triple mounts and could also carry up to 30 mines. After 1931, the torpedo tubes were replaced by  tubes which probably used the G7a torpedo.

A pair of  C/30 anti-aircraft guns were also added after 1931. The gun had an effective rate of fire of about 120 rounds per minute. Each boat carried 2,000 rounds per gun. Wartime additions were an extra pair of 2 cm guns in single mounts just forward of No. 2 gun. In late 1942 they were replaced by a quadruple 2 cm mount. Other guns that were added included three 2 cm guns positioned around the aft funnel, another pair mounted on the bridge wings, and a gun added in front of the bridge, all in single mounts. Around 1944 a FuMB 4 Sumatra radar detector was installed, as was radar.

Ships

Service
Most of the boats were initially assigned to the 3rd Torpedo Boat Half Flotilla. By the end of 1936, the Kriegsmarine had reorganized its torpedo boats into flotillas with Leopard and Luchs in the 2nd Torpedo Boat Flotilla and Wolf, Iltis, Jaguar and Tiger were assigned to the 3rd Torpedo Boat Flotilla. Both flotillas made several deployments to Spain during the Spanish Civil War. Around June 1938, the flotillas were again reorganized with Leopard and Luchs transferred to the 4th Torpedo Boat Flotilla. The other boats were either refitting or in reserve. On 1 July the 3rd Flotilla was renumbered as the 6th. Shortly before the German declaration of war on Poland on 1 September 1939, Tiger was sunk by a German destroyer which accidentally rammed her during night training.

World War II

At the beginning the 4th Flotilla was disbanded and boats were transferred to the 5th and 6th Torpedo Boat Flotillas. All of the Type 24s supported the North Sea mining operations that began on 3 September 1939, except Jaguar. On 13, 18 and 19 November, the 6th Flotilla and one or two light cruisers met destroyers returning from minelaying missions of the English coast. Two days later the flotilla patrolled the Skagerrak to inspect neutral shipping for contraband goods before returning to port on the 25th. From 14 to 16 December, Jaguar and the torpedo boat  made contraband patrols in the Skaggerak, impounding six ships.

Iltis was refitting, but all the other Type 24s played a minor role in the invasion of Norway in April 1940. Leopard and Wolf were assigned to support the attack on Bergen while Luchs, was tasked to help capture Kristiansand. Jaguar ferried reinforcements to Kristiansand. As the heavy cruiser  was proceeding to Germany without an escort two days later, she too was crippled by a British submarine off the Danish coast and all five boats responded to render assistance. While escorting a group of minelayers returning from laying a minefield in the Skaggerak on 30 April with Wolf, Leopard was sunk when she was accidentally rammed by one of the minelayers.

The 6th Flotilla was disbanded in April and all the torpedo boats were consolidated in the 5th Flotilla which continued to escort minelayers and damaged ships between Norway and Germany for the next several months. During one of these missions, Luchs was sunk by either a submarine or a floating mine on 26 July. The flotilla escorted minelaying missions in the North Sea in August and September before transferring to the English Channel in October. The first sortie in search of Allied shipping was unsuccessful, but another on 11–12 October sank four small ships. The flotilla's boats now started laying minefields themselves over the rest of the year and into early 1941. Wolf was sunk on one such mission on 8 January when she struck a mine herself.

Iltis and Jaguar were now the only surviving boats of the class and they continued lay minefields and escorted two battleships through the Bay of Biscay on 22 March after their North Atlantic raid. The sisters began refits the next month and were then transferred to the Skagerrak where they were on convoy escort duties until October. They were transferred to France in January 1942, rejoining the 5th Flotilla and were some of the escorts through the Channel for two battleships and a heavy cruiser during the Channel Dash in February. Both boats helped to screen a commerce raider through the Channel in March, but Iltis was sunk on 13 May when trying to escort another one. This left Jaguar as the sole surviving boat and she remained in France for the rest of the year, helping to escort German blockade runners sailing from ports in the Bay of Biscay en route to Japan.

She was transferred to Norwegian waters for escort work in early 1943, but returned to France midway through the year to help escort U-boats through the Bay of Biscay and continued to do so into early August. The boat helped to lay a minefield in the Channel in March 1944. As the Allies began landing in Normandy on 6 June, the 5th Flotilla sortied several times from Le Havre over the next week in attempts to sink Allied shipping. They were generally unsuccessful, only sinking a single destroyer on 6 June. Jaguar was sunk during an air raid by the Royal Air Force on the night of 14/15 June.

Notes

Citations

References

 
 
 

 

 
World War II torpedo boats of Germany
Torpedo boats of the Kriegsmarine
Ships of the Reichsmarine